This 2005 Sydney Roosters season was the 98th in the club's history. They competed in the NRL's 2005 Telstra Premiership and finished the regular season 9th (out of 15).

Results

Player Summary

References

Sydney Roosters seasons
Sydney Roosters season